Alfred Robinson may refer to:

Alfred Robinson (businessman) (1806–1895), American businessman
Alfred Robinson (footballer, born 1887) (1887–1945), English professional footballer for Grimsby Town
Alfred Robinson (footballer, born 1888) (1888–?), English professional footballer for Gainsborough Trinity and Blackburn Rovers
Alfred Robinson (footballer, born 1916) (1916–?), English professional footballer for York City
 Alfred D. Robinson (1866–1942), American horticulturalist
Alfred Robinson (British Army officer) (1894–1978)